Joseph Ignatino Meinzinger (February 18, 1892 – June 3, 1962) was an Ontario insurance salesman and political figure. He represented Waterloo North in the Legislative Assembly of Ontario from 1945 to 1948 as a Liberal-Labour member.

He was born in Berlin, Ontario (later Kitchener), the son of Ignatius Meinzinger. In 1918, he married Lillian Hummel. Meinzinger owned a boxing club in the city and served six years as mayor of Kitchener. He was a member of the Knights of Columbus. He died on June 3, 1962 and was buried on June 6, 1962 at Woodland Cemetery in Kitchener.

References

 Canadian Parliamentary Guide, 1947, PG Normandin

External links
Member's parliamentary history for the Legislative Assembly of Ontario
Waterloo County Hall of Fame

1892 births
1962 deaths
Liberal-Labour Ontario MPPs
Mayors of Kitchener, Ontario
Canadian Roman Catholics
Burials at Woodland Cemetery, Kitchener, Ontario